Raphew Tyrone Reed Jr. is an American hurdler and double gold medal winner at the 2004 Summer Paralympics in the T42-T46 (amputees) category.

Biography
Raphew Tyrone Jr. was born in Baton Rouge, Louisiana on May 12, 1985. His right arm did not fully develop when the amniotic band wrapped around the arm and suffocated it.

He started running track in the fifth grade for fun with his father, a former hurdler, training him.

Raphew attended Southern University Laboratory School where he lettered in Football, Track and Band. He was state runner up in the tenth grade and ran one of the fastest underclassmen times ever in 13.78 s.  In 2002 Raphew was the Louisiana 1A Regional and State Champion in the 110m HH.  In 2003 Raphew Placed 3rd in the AAU National Indoor Championships in the 60mH. He competed for the USA Paralympics team for the first time in June 2003. In the Athletics at the 2004 Summer Paralympics  he was a member of the winning teams in both the 4 x 100 metres and 4 x 400 metres relays. He is ranked by the IAAF in the top ten hurdlers in the world, both indoor and outdoor, for 2005.

In 2003 Raphew signed a Track and Field scholarship from the University of Mississippi (Ole Miss) to run High Hurdles. He is majoring in International Business with a minor in Political Science.

He is the Founder of The Reed Foundation Inc. a Non profit charity developed to help those Children and adults (specializing in Military Veterans) with disabilities.

Major Achievements

2005 Achievements

2005: United States Track and Field 60m Hurdles Top Ten Demestic Ranking
2005: International Association of Athletics Federation 110m Hurdles Top 20 World Ranking
2005: AAU National Indoor Hurdle Champion

2004 Achievements

2004: 4x400 relay World Record member in Athens, Greece at the Paralympic Games
2004: 4x400 Gold Medalist Athens, Greece at the Paralympic Games
2004: 4x100 Gold Medalist Athens, Greece at the Paralympic Games
2004: 400m 8th-place finish in Athens, Greece at the Paralympic Games
2004: 3rd Place Finish at the United States Olympic Trials in the Amputee Race
2004: Ranked Top Five in the World by International Paralympic Committee in the 100m, 200m, and 400m
2004: Placed 13 at the Southeastern Conference Outdoor Championships

2003 Achievements

2003: United Stars Track Club All American
2003: Dyestat Track and Field Indoor and Outdoor All American
2003: Track and Field News All American
2003: AAU Indoor Hurdle Indoor All American

2002 Achievements

2002: AAU Region 9-B 110m HH Champion
2002: Dystat Track and Field All American
2002: Louisiana All State First Team
2002: East Baton Rouge Parish First Team
2002: Louisiana State 110m High Hurdle champion
2002: District 6-1A Honorable Mention Place Kicker
2002: Southern University Laboratory Football Team

2001 Achievements

2001: United States Track and Field Association 110m Hurdle Champion
2001: Louisiana State 110 High Hurdler Runner-up
2001: Dyestat Track and Field All American

References

1. Dyestat 2002 Outdoor National Rankings (accessed 3rd February 2007

2. Dyestat 2001 Outdoor National Rankings (accessed 3rd February 2007)

3.  College Bound Teen Magazine Interview

4.Track Stars to Release Album ( The DM Online Review on several olemiss Track Athletes)

External links
Raphew Reed Jr's bio from the 2004 Paralympics games
Raphew Reed Official Website
Raphew's Athlete Representative
Raphew's Marketing Management

1985 births
Living people
Paralympic track and field athletes of the United States
Athletes (track and field) at the 2004 Summer Paralympics
Paralympic gold medalists for the United States
American male hurdlers
World record holders in Paralympic athletics
African-American male track and field athletes
Sportspeople from Baton Rouge, Louisiana
University of Mississippi alumni
Medalists at the 2004 Summer Paralympics
Paralympic medalists in athletics (track and field)
21st-century African-American sportspeople
20th-century African-American people
American male sprinters